Banks in Greenland include the following:

Bank of Greenland (GrønlandsBANKEN)  SWIFT: GRENGLGX
BankNordik  SWIFT: FIFBFOTX

Greenland currently has one main commercial bank since the merger of Bank of Greenland and Nuna Bank in 1997.

Banks
Greenland
Greenland